Holland Patent High School is a U.S. high school located in Holland Patent, New York, a village in Oneida County, central New York State, about  northwest of Utica and  east of Rome. The area served by the school is primarily a residential bedroom community for several small- to medium-sized cities, including Utica, Rome, and Syracuse.

460 students were enrolled in the school as of the 2018–19 school year, with the senior class having 121 members. The average class size is 23.

Seven advanced placement courses (English Language and Composition, Government, US History, World History, Biology, Music Theory, Chinese) and are offered in addition to the usual high school curriculum. Holland Patent offers an array of dual-credit classes with Mohawk Valley Community College and two writing courses with Syracuse University Project Advance. The school has an average SAT score of 1094, and an average ACT score of 24. The SAT score is in the 68th percentile, nationally, while the school's ACT composite score is in the 74th percentile, nationally. 72% of the Class of 2018 went on to continue their education. 38% went on to 4-year colleges, 30% went on to 2-year colleges, 2% went on to trade schools, and 2% joined the military.

In addition to excellence in the classroom, Holland Patent has a particularly successful sports program. The athletics program at Holland Patent offers 14 boys' sports and 13 girls' sports. The fall 2018 season brought particular success to the Golden Knights. Holland Patent Football captured their first sectional title in 29 years, in addition to their first league title since 1997. Holland Patent Girls' Soccer won their first sectional title, and advanced to the championship match in the NYSPHSAA state tournament, ousting state ranked  2 Academy of the Holy Names in a raucous game that resulted in several yellow cards being handed to both teams, a red card to a player from the Academy of the Holy Names, and one parent ejection for screaming obscenities at a ref. The Holland Patent Field Hockey Team (HOPAFIHO) defended their 2017 sectional title. The Holland Patent Lady Aqua Knights (Girls' swim and dive), under the leadership of coach Mark Celecki, finished 2nd at sectionals and sent a slew of teammates to state qualifiers. The boys tennis team proved to be strong in the spring season with an easy victory over undefeated Cooperstown (69-0). In addition to sports, the school offers a co-ed cheer squad for the fall/winter seasons and many arts programs, including music and drama studies.

The current principal is Russell E. Stevener, Jr.  As of October 2018, there were 41 teaching staff.

References

External links
School description from Holland Patent High School website

Educational institutions in the United States with year of establishment missing
Public high schools in New York (state)
Schools in Oneida County, New York